Woodbine Municipal Airport  is a city-owned public-use airport located one nautical mile (2 km) east of the central business district of Woodbine, a city in Harrison County, Iowa, United States.

Facilities and aircraft 
It has one runway designated 17/35 with a 2,045 by 95 feet (623 x 29 m) turf surface. For the 12-month period ending September 17, 2007, the airport had 560 aircraft operations, an average of 46 per month, all of which were general aviation.

References

External links 
 Woodbine Municipal Airport (3Y4) at Iowa DOT Airport Directory

Woodbine, Iowa
Airports in Iowa
Transportation buildings and structures in Harrison County, Iowa